Harry Keels Thomas Jr. (born June 3, 1956) is an American diplomat who served as the U.S. Ambassador to Bangladesh, the Philippines, and Zimbabwe.

Career
Thomas joined the Foreign Service in 1984. His early postings included service in the US embassies in New Delhi, India; Harare, Zimbabwe; Kaduna, Nigeria; and Lima, Peru.  He also served as Executive Secretary of the United States Department of State, Director General of the U.S. Foreign Service, Director of the State Department Operations Center, and Special Assistant to the then-U.S. Secretary of State Condoleezza Rice.

Thomas served as United States Ambassador to Bangladesh (serving from 2003 to 2005) and Director General of the United States Foreign Service (serving from 2007 to 2009), Thomas was designated by US President Barack Obama on November 19, 2009, to replace Kristie Kenney as Ambassador to the Philippines—the first African American to serve at that post. He was confirmed by the United States Senate on March 19, 2010, and presented his credentials to Philippine president Gloria Macapagal Arroyo on April 27, 2010. He was then nominated and confirmed as the United States Ambassador to Zimbabwe on October 22, 2015. He was sworn in on December 8, 2015. He returned to the United States from Zimbabwe on March 25, 2018, planning to retire from the Foreign Service.

Education
Thomas is a graduate of the College of the Holy Cross and earned his Master's of Science in Urban Planning at Columbia University. He also has an honorary doctorate from Loyola University Maryland, where he delivered the commencement address in May 2010.

Controversy

In September 2011, Thomas sparked outrage – while in post as Ambassador to the Philippines – by making the remark that "40% of male tourists to the Philippines go there for sex tourism", without publicly presenting evidence for this remark.   He subsequently made a public apology to the Department of Foreign Affairs of the Philippines.

Foreign languages
Thomas speaks English, Spanish, Hindi, Tagalog, and Bengali.

Awards and honours

Foreign honours
:
 Grand Cross (Datu) of the Order of Sikatuna (GrCS) (October 14, 2013)

References

External links
 
 
 US Department of State biography

|-

|-

|-

|-

1956 births
Living people
Columbia Graduate School of Architecture, Planning and Preservation alumni
College of the Holy Cross alumni
United States Foreign Service personnel
African-American diplomats
Ambassadors of the United States to Bangladesh
Ambassadors of the United States to the Philippines
Ambassadors of the United States to Zimbabwe
Directors General of the United States Foreign Service
21st-century African-American people
21st-century American diplomats
20th-century African-American people